Rock On may refer to:

Songs 
 "Rock On" (David Essex song), 1973, also covered by Michael Damian, Def Leppard and others
 "Rock On" (Tucker Beathard song), 2016
 "Rock On", a 1995 song by Funkdoobiest from Brothas Doobie
 "Rock On!", a 1972 song by Gary Glitter from Glitter
 "Rock On," a 1972 song by T. Rex from The Slider
 "Rock On", a 1988 song by Black 'N Blue from In Heat, also covered by Doro (1990)

Albums 
 Rock On! (Barry Stanton and Johnny Rebb album), 1981
 Rock On (The Bunch album), 1972
 Rock On (David Essex album), 1973
 Rock On (Humble Pie album), 1971
 Rock On (Raydio album), 1979
 Rock On (The Screaming Jets album), 2005
 Rock On!! (soundtrack), a soundtrack album from the 2008 Bollywood film (see below)
 Rock On! (Del Shannon album), 1991

Film and television 
 Rock On!!, a 2008 Bollywood rock musical film
 Rock On 2, a 2016 sequel to the 2008 film 
 Rock On!, a 2019 episode of Schitt's Creek
 Rock On (2005 film), a DVD released by the Australian band The Screaming Jets
 Bandslam (working title Rock On), a 2009 American musical romantic-comedy film
 "Rock On!" (Corner Gas) an episode of Corner Gas

Video games 
 Rock-On, a 1989 video game for the PC Engine

Other 
 Sign of the horns